The John L. Senn House is located in Alma, Wisconsin, USA.

Description
Among the features of the house are pierced barge boards. It was listed on the National Register of Historic Places in 1982 and on the State Register of Historic Places in 1989.

References

Houses on the National Register of Historic Places in Wisconsin
National Register of Historic Places in Buffalo County, Wisconsin
Houses in Buffalo County, Wisconsin
Brick buildings and structures
Houses completed in 1885